Herman Narula (born April 1988) is a British Indian businessman and the co-founder and CEO of Improbable Worlds Limited, a British multinational technology company founded in 2012. It makes distributed simulation software enabling virtual worlds for video games, defence organisations and metaverse environments.

Early life
Narula was born in April 1988, in Delhi, India, before his family moved to the UK when he was three years old. He is the son of Harpinder Singh Narula, who runs DSC Ltd, the family construction business, and Surina Narula, a prominent philanthropist devoted to children's rights and other social and environmental causes. He has two older brothers, Anhad and Manhad, who work for DSC.

He was educated at Haberdashers' Aske's Boys' School, Elstree, and Girton College, Cambridge, where he studied computer science.

He first became interested in video games at the age of seven, beginning with the game Magic Carpet; he began coding at the age of 12, in C++. Narula has said that his parents did not limit his screen time in childhood.

Narula met his Improbable co-founder Rob Whitehead while studying computer science at Girton College Cambridge. Both shared an interest in gaming and a belief that video games held an unrecognised importance in the wider world; both were averse to a career in finance.

Career
Narula and Whitehead started Improbable with backing from the Narula family and a group of American and European investors. In May 2017 the company attracted a further $502 million of investment from Softbank, valuing the company  $1 billion. In 2020 The Telegraph Tech 100 estimated Narula's net worth at £450 million.

Narula has criticised efforts made by traditional technology platforms to control the metaverse. In 2019 Narula gave a speech at TED Global titled "The Transformative Power of Video Games", arguing that games are an egalitarian medium through which millions of people may co-inhabit the same space, develop life skills and make human connections. In an interview with Games Industry Biz, Narula said "Hypothetically, one day, if 100m, or 1 billion, people entered simultaneously into a virtual world, that would cease to be a game - that would be a country."  In 2019 he gave Girton College's Founders Enterprise Lecture, titled “Virtual Worlds: The Next Great Wilderness”.

Narula believes that earning a living in the metaverse will become a routine activity, and that computer simulation could be "steel for the 21st century", with every major infrastructure project requiring some form of digital twin. He sees the metaverse also becoming an extension of real-world culture into the digital economy.

He has argued that the metaverse cannot be owned or controlled solely by a narrow group of corporations, and that value created in the metaverse should be shared with community members.  In a 2022 interview with The Times, he said: “We need to get comfortable with the idea that this is not really about companies, it’s about communities. And those communities need to decide the rules, of what sort of things are acceptable and what is not.”

Publications 
Narula is the author of Virtual Society: The Metaverse and the New Frontiers of Human Experience, (Penguin Random House, October 2022).

The book considers the metaverse in the context of the human instinct to derive meaning and purpose from conceptual communities. Narula argues that humans have always sought to live in some form of virtual world.  He cites examples from ancient history and contemporary culture, such as the Egyptian concept of the afterlife that gave rise to the pyramids, through to the enduring popularity of movie franchises and fantasy league sports, which for some inhabitants may equal the physical world for fulfilment, trust, and economic trade. Narula believes the metaverse may eventually foster transhumanism, but also that a true brain/computer interface is a distant prospect. The book features endorsements from Marc Andreessen, Arianna Huffington and Adam Grant.

Personal life 
Narula lives in the Narula family home in Barnet, North London.  

He supports Plan International, which advocates for children’s rights and equality for girls.

In interview Narula named Ronald Ayme's The Roman Revolution as his favourite book and Gladiator his favourite film. He follows Arsenal football team and attends matches at the Emirates Stadium. He speaks English and Hindi, and is friends with Demis Hassabis, the DeepMind founder.

Narula meditates daily.

In 2017 he was nominated for The Sunday Times' Business Person of the Year.  In 2018 he was named to the Maserati 100 list of notable entrepreneurs; he does not own a car, preferring Uber.

References 

1988 births
Alumni of Girton College, Cambridge
Living people
People educated at Haberdashers' Boys' School
People from Hertfordshire
Indian emigrants to the United Kingdom
British company founders
Naturalised citizens of the United Kingdom